Edward Michael Connelly (September 8, 1892 – August 31, 1947) was a federal prosecutor and justice of the Washington Supreme Court from 1946 to 1947. He was appointed to the Supreme Court by Governor Monrad Wallgren, and served less than one year.  In 1946, he was defeated in the election, losing to King County Superior Court judge Matthew W. Hill. After leaving the court, Connelly returned to private practice in Spokane, Washington.

Connelly was born in Bellingham, Washington, to Patrick E. Connelly and Elizabeth Murphy, and attended grade school there. When his family moved to Spokane, he enrolled in Gonzaga University, graduating in 1912. He was in the first graduating class at Gonzaga Law School, receiving a LL.B. degree in 1915. In 1921, he taught property law at Gonzaga University Law School. From 1922 to 1926, he worked as a Deputy Prosecuting Attorney for Spokane County Prosecuting Attorney, Charles H. Leavy. In private practice, he was renowned as a trial lawyer. Connelly served as United States District Attorney for the Eastern District of Washington from 1942 to 1946.

References

1892 births
1947 deaths
Justices of the Washington Supreme Court
Gonzaga University alumni
Gonzaga University School of Law alumni
People from Spokane, Washington
20th-century American lawyers
United States Attorneys for the Eastern District of Washington
Washington (state) Democrats
20th-century American judges